The Cumberland Inn & Museum, located in Williamsburg, Kentucky, are owned and operated by University of the Cumberlands. The facility opened in May 1994 as a way for Cumberland College to offer its students a positive work experience while promoting the college to visitors.

They currently employ over 60 college students on both a part and full-time basis. The students work in every area of the hotel, including the museum, the conference center and the inn's Patriot Steakhouse.

The Henkelmann Life Science Collection has "hundreds of specimens ranging from the petite short-tailed Shrew to the gigantic Polar Bear, procured by Henry and Mary Henkelmann on expeditions from Africa to the Arctic. The animals are displayed in surroundings created to match their natural habitats. A visit to this great exhibit fosters an appreciation of the beauty of life."

The Robert O. Williams museum now contains over 7,000 crosses and crucifixes. The collection started when as a chaplain in the Air Force Williams he became aware of the special symbolism the cross had for Christians and of the variety of forms that had been used to portray this symbol.

The museum's collections were featured on Kentucky Educational Television.

References

External links
Cumberland Inn & Museum Official website

Museums established in 1977
Natural history museums in Kentucky
Museums in Whitley County, Kentucky
University museums in Kentucky
1977 establishments in Kentucky
University of the Cumberlands
Hotels in Kentucky